Rond may refer to:

Bassin Rond, pond located beside the Canal de la Sensée as it joins the Canal de l'Escaut near Estrun
Da Rond Stovall (born 1973), former Major League Baseball player
De Wereld Rond, the fifth studio album by the Flemish band K3
Jean le Rond d'Alembert (1717–1783), French mathematician, mechanician, physicist, philosopher, and music theorist
Joseph Rond, American tug of war competitor who competed in the 1920 Summer Olympics
Théâtre du Rond-Point, theatre in Paris, located at 2bis avenue Franklin-D.-Roosevelt, 8th arrondissement
Villers-le-Rond, commune in the Meurthe-et-Moselle department in north-eastern France